Promachoi (before 1926: Μπάχοβο - Bachovo) is a village in Pella regional unit, Macedonia, Greece.

Promachoi had 1754 inhabitants in 1981. In fieldwork done by Riki Van Boeschoten in late 1993, Promachoi was populated by Slavophones. The Macedonian language was spoken in the village by people over 30 in public and private settings. Children understood the language, but mostly did not use it.

References

External link

Populated places in Pella (regional unit)